Dashrath Manjhi (14 January 1934 – 17 August 2007), also known as Mountain Man, was an Indian laborer from Gehlaur village, near Gaya in the state of Bihar. When his wife died in 1959 due to injury caused by falling from a mountain and due to the same mountain blocking easy access to a nearby hospital in time, he decided to carve a 110 meter-long (360 ft), and 9.1 meter-wide (30 ft) wide path and 7.7 meter-deep (25 ft) path through a ridge of hills using only a hammer and a chisel. After 22 years of work, Dashrath shortened travel between the Atri and Wazirganj 
blocks of Gaya district from 55 km to 15 km. He travelled to New Delhi to get recognition of his work and was rewarded by then Chief Minister of Bihar, Nitish Kumar. In 2016, Indian Post issued a postage stamp featuring Manjhi.

Early life
Dashrath Manjhi was born into a Musahar family, at the lowest rank of India's caste system. He ran away from his home at a young age and worked in the coal mines at Dhanbad. Later he returned to the village of Gehlaur and married Falguni (or Phaguni) Devi.

Gehlaur was and remains a small village with few resources, and while it lies in a plain it is bordered on the south by a steeply ascending quartzite ridge of Mesoproterozoic (1- 1.6 billion years) age (part of the Rajgir hills) that prevented road access from the town of Wazirganj.

Accident and road building
After he returned to Gehlaur, Manjhi became an agricultural labourer. Some reports say she was injured while walking along a narrow path across the rocky ridge to bring water or lunch to Manjhi, who had to work away from the village at a location south of the ridge; other reports link the path across the ridge to the delayed care but not to Falguni Devi's injuries.

As a result of this experience Manjhi resolved to cut a roadway across the ridge to make his village more accessible. Manjhi felt the need to do something for society and decided to carve a path through the ridge so that his village could have easier access to medical care.

He carved a path 110 m long, 7.7 m deep in places and 9.1 m wide to form a road through the ridge of rocks. He said, "When I started hammering the hill, people called me a lunatic but that steeled my resolve."

He completed the work in 22 years (1960–1982). This path reduced the distance between the Atri and Wazirganj sectors of Gaya district from 55 km to 15 km. Though mocked for his efforts, Manjhi's work has made life easier for people of the Gehlaur village. Later, Manjhi said, "Though most villagers taunted me at first, there were quite a few who lent me support later by giving me food and helping me buy my tools."

Official roads between his village in Atri and Wazirganj, over the path he carved, were only built after his death in 2007.

Death
Manjhi was diagnosed with gallbladder cancer and was admitted to the All India Institutes of Medical Sciences (AIIMS) in New Delhi on 23 July 2007. He died there on 17 August 2007. He was given a state funeral by the Government of Bihar.

For his feat, Manjhi became popularly known as the 'Mountain Man'. The Bihar government also proposed his name for the Padma Shree award in 2006 in the social service sector.

A stamp featuring Dashrath Manjhi was released by India Post in the "Personalities of Bihar" series on 26 December 2016.

In popular culture
Dashrath Manjhi's story has been the subject of at least one documentary and several dramatic treatments on film and television.

The first of these was a supporting character based on Manjhi in the 1998 Kannada-language movie Bhoomi Thayiya Chochchala Maga. Manjhi's story also had a minor role in a later Kannada film, 2011's Olave Mandara directed by Jayatheertha.

In 2011, director Kumud Ranjan working for the state-owned Films Division of India produced a documentary based on Manjhi's life titled The Man Who Moved the Mountain.

In August 2015, a Hindi movie Manjhi - The Mountain Man was released and well received. The movie was directed by Ketan Mehta. Nawazuddin Siddiqui played the role of Manjhi along with Radhika Apte as Falguni Devi.

The first episode of Season 2 of the Aamir Khan hosted TV Show Satyamev Jayate, aired in March 2014, was dedicated to Dashrath Manjjhi. Aamir Khan and Rajesh Ranjan also met Bhagirath Manjhi and Basanti Devi, son and daughter-in-law of Manjhi, and promised to provide financial help. However, Basanti Devi died due to his inability to afford medical care on 1 April 2014.

Gallery

References

Sources

External links
  — location of the passage carved by Dashrath Manjhi through the Rajgir Hills rock formation

People from Gaya district
1934 births
2007 deaths
Deaths from gallbladder cancer
Deaths from cancer in India
Indian Hindus